Goswin is a Germanic male given name originally meaning "friend (win) of the Goths (gos)" As Gosewijn, Goswijn or Gozewijn (with short forms Goos, Goes, Gosse and Geus) it was quite common in the Middle Ages in the Low Countries.  Latinized versions include Gos(s)uinus, Gosvinus, and Goswinus, while in French the name has been rendered Gosvin and Gossuin (e.g. :fr:Gossuin d'Anchin). 

People with this name include:

Gosse Ludigman (died 1000), possibly fictitious governor of Western Frisia
Goswin I of Heinsberg (ca. 1060–1128), Limburg count, lord of Valkenburg
Goswin of Anchin (c. 1085–1165), Flemish Benedictine abbot and saint
Goswin (bishop of Poznań), 12th-century Polish Bishop
Goswin of Bossut (fl. 1230s), Cistercian writer
Gozewijn van Randerath (fl. 1250), Bishop of Utrecht 
 (died 1359), ruler of Livonia
Goswin Haex van Loenhout (died 1475), Auxiliary Bishop of Utrecht
Goswin van der Weyden (1455–1543), Flemish painter
Goswin Nickel (1582–1664), German Jesuit priest 
Goswin de Fierlant (ca. 1735—1804), Flemish councillor
Goswin de Stassart (1780–1854), Dutch-Belgian politician
 (1810–1887), Dutch physician and University Dean
Goswin Karl Uphues(1841–1916), German philosopher
 (1850–1919), German historian
Goos Meeuwsen (born 1982), Dutch circus performer

References

Germanic masculine given names